The Central Bureau of Statistics of Aruba,  is in charge of the collection, processing and publication of statistics and reports to the Minister charged with responsibility for the subject of Statistics. It was created mainly to facilitate the development of a statistical system for Aruba which is also a component of the CARICOM regional statistical system together with other member countries of this regional institution.

Mission
Become the leading organization to compile and publish undisputed, coherent and up-to-date statistical information that is relevant for practice, policy and research.

Legislation
Statistics Aruba is governed by the Statistics Act, GT 1991.

Organisation
The Central Bureau of Statistics (CBS) is the institution officially assigned with the collection, processing and publication of statistics to be used by policymakers, in practice and for research in different areas. It is a government department that resorts under the jurisdiction of the Ministry of Finance and Economic Affairs.

Objective statistical information is vital to an open and democratic society. It provides a solid foundation for informed decision-making by elected representatives, businesses, unions and non-profit organizations, as well as the general individual Aruban population. It’s also recognized as an inexhaustible source for scientific research.

Leadership
The director of Statistics Aruba is the Chief Statistician of Aruba. Since 1986, the former directors of the Central Bureau of Statistics Aruba were:
 Enrique Jaccopucci (1986–1994)
 Randolf Lee (1996-2009)

History
{| class="wikitable"
|+ Previous heads of the statistics service in Aruba
! width=300 | Name: 
! width=100 | Period
|-
| Randolf Lee
| 1996-2009
|-
| Enrique Jaccopucci
| 1986–1994
|-
|
|      -1986
|}

Publications
Statistics Aruba publishes numerous documents covering a range of statistical information about Aruba, including census data, demography, Tourism,  economic and health indicators,

See also
 Statistics Netherlands
 Sub-national autonomous statistical services
 United Nations Statistics Division

References

External links

Ministerie van Economische Zaken, Sociale Zaken en Cultuur
Anguilla statistics indicators on CARICOM Statical indicators publication
Aruba statistical system on United Nations Statistics Division website
CARICOM Statistics

Official statistics
Aruba